Jamie L. Flick (born ) is an American politician and businessman who has represented the 83rd District in the Pennsylvania House of Representatives since 2023 as a member of the Republican Party.

Early life
Flick was born in Pennsylvania, and grew up on his family's farm in Lycoming County. He graduated from Jersey Shore Area High School in 1979. Flick earned an associate degree in software engineering from the Pennsylvania College of Technology in 1981.

Career
A businessman from South Williamsport, Pennsylvania, Flick became a co-owner of the Australian baseball team the Sydney Blue Sox in 2018. Prior to his run for Pennsylvania State Representative, Flick owned and managed Susquehanna Software, a software company located in Williamsport.

In 2022, Flick ran to represent the open 83rd District seat in the Pennsylvania House of Representatives. He defeated fellow Republican Ann Kaufman in the primary election, and went on to win the general election unopposed.

Flick currently sits on the State House's Children & Youth, Government Oversight, and Human Services Committees.

Electoral history

References

Living people
Republican Party members of the Pennsylvania House of Representatives
21st-century American politicians
People from Lycoming County, Pennsylvania
Businesspeople from Pennsylvania